David Chung (September 6, 1946 – April 14, 2006) was a Korean-American actor.  He was nominated for an Independent Spirit Award for his performance in the 1993 film The Ballad of Little Jo.

Filmography

References

External links
 
 

1946 births
2006 deaths
American male actors of Korean descent
South Korean emigrants to the United States